Gaëtan Karlen (born 7 June 1993) is a Swiss professional footballer who plays as a forward for Swiss Super League club Sion.

Personal life
Gaëtan's brother Gregory is also a professional footballer. They have both played for Sion and Thun.

References

External links
 

1993 births
Living people
People from Sion, Switzerland
Association football forwards
Swiss men's footballers
Switzerland under-21 international footballers
Swiss Super League players
Swiss Challenge League players
FC Sion players
FC Biel-Bienne players
FC Thun players
Neuchâtel Xamax FCS players
Sportspeople from Valais